Veto Kissell (June 13, 1927 – March 19, 1997) was an American football linebacker and fullback. He played for the Buffalo Bills in 1949 and for the Baltimore Colts in 1950.

References

1927 births
1997 deaths
American football linebackers
American football fullbacks
Holy Cross Crusaders football players
Buffalo Bills players
Baltimore Colts players
Players of American football from New Hampshire
Sportspeople from Nashua, New Hampshire
Baltimore Colts (1947–1950) players